Seumas O'Kelly (1881 – 14 November 1918) was an Irish journalist, fiction writer, and playwright.

Born in Loughrea, County Galway, O'Kelly was educated locally and began his career as a journalist with the Cork newspaper Southern Star. He moved from The Southern Star to the Leinster Leader in Naas where he remained as Editor until he went to work in 1916 for Nationality, the Sinn Féin party newspaper. Michael O'Kelly more militant brother took over at the Leader in 1912, but was interned after the April 1916 Easter Rising. Seumas returned to the Leader for a brief stint. There is a plaque in his honour outside the Leader'''s offices which reads "Seumas O'Kelly – a gentle revolutionary". He wrote numerous plays, short stories, and novels. His short story "The Weaver's Grave" is among the most acclaimed of Irish short stories. A radio version of this, adapted and produced by Mícheál Ó hAodha, won the Prix Italia for Radio Drama in 1961.

O'Kelly was a friend of the Irish nationalist Arthur Griffith, founder of both the political party Sinn Féin and its newspaper Nationality. He died prematurely of a heart attack following a raid at the paper's headquarters at Harcourt St.

 Prose fiction 
These three books are available in digital copies at HathiTrust as of November 2018.
 
 Waysiders: Stories of Connacht (Dublin: The Talbot Press and London: T. Fisher Unwin, 1917) – 10 stories
 The Lady of Deerpark (London: Methuen, 1917) 
 The Golden Barque and The Weaver's Grave (Talbot, 1919) – 2 novellas 
 The Leprechaun of Killmeen'' (Dublin: Martin Lester, 1920) – novella

References

External links
 
 
 
 Seumas O'Kelly Papers, 1904–1975 at Southern Illinois University Carbondale, Special Collections Research Center
  (previous page of browse report, as 'O'Kelly, Seumas, 1881–1918')

1881 births
1918 deaths
Irish male dramatists and playwrights
Irish journalists
Irish male short story writers
People from County Galway
People from Loughrea
Irish male novelists
20th-century Irish novelists
20th-century Irish male writers
20th-century Irish dramatists and playwrights
20th-century Irish short story writers
20th-century journalists